Prehistorik is a platform game developed by Titus Interactive for the Amiga, Atari ST, Amstrad CPC, MS-DOS, and Commodore CDTV. Titus Interactive also published it in 1991.

A sequel, Prehistorik 2, was released for MS-DOS and Amstrad CPC. The sequel was also ported to numerous Nintendo systems and became a downloadable title for the Nintendo DSi in North America on February 15, 2010. In 2013, Anuman Interactive launched a remake of the game, adapted for iOS and Android.

Gameplay

References

External links
Prehistorik at Lemon Amiga
Prehistorik at Atari Mania
Zzap review
Amiga Action review

Amiga games
Amstrad CPC games
Atari ST games
Commodore CDTV games
DOS games
Dinosaurs in video games
Platform games
1991 video games
Titus Software games
Video games developed in France
Video games set in prehistory
Prehistoric people in popular culture
Games commercially released with DOSBox

Single-player video games